Siarhiej Dubaviec (Сяргей Дубавец, ; born. September 17, 1959 in Mazyr) is a Belarusian journalist and writer.

Graduated from the Belarusian State University journalism faculty.

Worked for the Belarusian Soviet Encyclopaedia publishing house, the newspaper Homielskaja Praŭda and illegal anti-Soviet newspapers.

Editor of literature critics department in "Nioman magazine" (1987-1990), chief editor of the newspapers "Svaboda" (1990-1991) and "Naša Niva" (1991-2000), the radio "Bałtyjskija Chvali" (2000-2001), author of the programme "Vostraja Brama" on the Radio Liberty Belarusian edition (since 1997).

Resides currently in Vilnius.

He was awarded Belarusian Democratic Republic 100th Jubilee Medal by the Rada of the Belarusian Democratic Republic.

Books by Siarhiej Dubaviec:
"Praktykavańni" (Practices, 1991),
"Русская книга" (The Russian book, 1997),
"Dziońnik pryvatnaha čałavieka" (A private person's diary, 1998).
"Jak?" (How?, 2009)

References

External links 
 Siarhiej Dubaviec's blog

1959 births
Living people
People from Mazyr
Belarusian bloggers
Belarusian journalists
Belarusian writers